Spinella is an Italian surname. Notable people with the surname include:

Ezequiel Spinella (born 1999), Argentine footballer
Ralph Spinella (1923–2021), American fencer
Stephen Spinella (born 1956), American actor

See also
Spinella (brachiopod), an extinct genus in order Palaeocopida

Italian-language surnames